Grace Moore (born 21 May 1996) is an Irish rugby player from London, England. She plays for Railway Union and the Ireland women's national rugby union team.

Club career 
London-born Moore's first club was Streatham- Croydon RFC and she concentrated on rugby with them in 2018, her last year in university. She joined Premier 15s side Richmond Women a year later. She was a winger when she started but finished the season in their back row. She joined All-Ireland League side Railway Union in Dublin in 2020.

International career 
Moore’s potential to play for Ireland was identified by Steven McGinnis through Irish Rugby Union's IQ (Irish Qualified) Programme. Her talent was developed through the Ireland women's national rugby sevens programme and she made her debut in the Dubai Sevens in December 2019.

With international sevens in a hiatus in due to the global pandemic in 2020 she was selected to train with Ireland women's national rugby union team in the winter of 2020.

She was one of five new Sevens players introduced to the Irish squad for the 2021 Women's Six Nations.

She made her 2021 Women's Six Nations debut, as a replacement, in the third/fourth place playoff against Italy.

She was selected for the Ireland women's national rugby sevens team for the 2021-2022 season.

Personal life 
Moore played netball and volleyball to a high level before switching to rugby. She was a primary school PE teacher in England before being contracted to the Irish Rugby Union Sevens programme in 2020.She is training to be a physical trainer at Setanta College.

Honours

References

External links 
https://www.irishrugby.ie/women/grace-moore/

1996 births
Living people